Michael and Margaret Heller House, also known as the Heller Homestead, is a historic home located at Lower Saucon Township, Northampton County, Pennsylvania.  The house is a two-part building, renovated in 1934–1935 in the Colonial Revival style. The house has a two-story, five bay main block built about 1820, with a two-story, two bay core structure to the rear built about 1751.  Also on the property are the contributing Widow's House, built in 1850, and a mid-19th century root cellar.

It was added to the National Register of Historic Places in 2010.

Gallery

References

Houses on the National Register of Historic Places in Pennsylvania
Colonial Revival architecture in Pennsylvania
Houses in Northampton County, Pennsylvania
National Register of Historic Places in Northampton County, Pennsylvania
1750s establishments in Pennsylvania